Continental Army Encampment Site is a historic site located at Wilmington, New Castle County, Delaware. The Continental Army troops camped on the east side of Brandywine Creek, which is now a part of
Brandywine Park.  An early mill race is still visible, on the site, a reminder of the
extensive early milling industry on the Brandywine.  The Continental Army camped at the site for a few days before the Battle of Brandywine in August 1777.  On December 21, 1777, 1,500 Delaware and Maryland troops under the command of General William Smallwood returned to the campsite. These troops were stationed to prevent occupation of Wilmington by the British and to protect the flour mills on the Brandywine.

It was added to the National Register of Historic Places in 1973.

See also

American Revolutionary War
List of American Revolutionary War battles

References

Military facilities on the National Register of Historic Places in Delaware
Buildings and structures in Wilmington, Delaware
National Register of Historic Places in Wilmington, Delaware
American Revolutionary War
American Revolution on the National Register of Historic Places
Protected areas established in 1973